A referendum on joining the Union of South Africa was held in the Colony of Natal on 10 June 1909. It was approved by 75% of voters, and Natal became part of the Union when it was established on 31 May 1910.

Results

References

1909 referendums
Referendums in Natal
1909 in the Colony of Natal